Kai-Kai is a town and commune in Cameroon.

2013 dam failure and flood 
On the night of 17-18 Sep 2013, heavy rains caused the rupture of the dam along the Logone River at the town of Dougui, Kai Kai District in the Far North Region of Cameroon. This caused initial evacuations of people to the banks of the dam. On 27 Sep, a second rupture in the dam 4 km from the first rupture started flooding the area and nearly 9,000 people were displaced.

See also
Communes of Cameroon

References

 Site de la primature - Élections municipales 2002 
 Contrôle de gestion et performance des services publics communaux des villes camerounaises - Thèse de Donation Avele, Université Montesquieu Bordeaux IV 
 Charles Nanga, La réforme de l’administration territoriale au Cameroun à la lumière de la loi constitutionnelle n° 96/06 du 18 janvier 1996, Mémoire ENA. 

Populated places in Far North Region (Cameroon)
Communes of Cameroon